Sayin' Somethin' is an album by jazz cornetist Nat Adderley released on the Atlantic label featuring four performances by Adderley with an 11-piece orchestra and four by Adderley's Quintet with Joe Henderson, Herbie Hancock, Bob Cranshaw, and Roy McCurdy.

Reception
The Allmusic review by Scott Yanow states "Cornetist Nat Adderley was at the peak of his powers in the mid-1960s... making this set one to search for". The Penguin Guide to Jazz awarded the album 3 stars stating "Hearing Nat in the presence of both Joe Henderson and Herbie Hancock provides ample reminder that his approach to hard bop and soul-jazz was one that very much stayed up with the times".

Track listing

All compositions by Nat Adderley except as indicated
 "Manchild" - 2:48  
 "Call Me" (Tony Hatch) - 3:08  
 "Walls of Jericho" (Traditional) - 6:56  
 "Gospelette" - 3:13  
 "Satin Doll" (Duke Ellington, Billy Strayhorn, Johnny Mercer) - 2:43  
 "Cantaloupe Island" (Herbie Hancock) - 7:22  
 "Hippodelphia" (Joe Zawinul) - 3:42  
 "The Other Side" - 7:07  
Recorded in New York City on January 13, 1966 (tracks 3, & 6-8) and December 20, 1965 (tracks 1, 2, 4 & 5)

Personnel
Nat Adderley – cornet
Joe Henderson (tracks 3, & 6-8) - tenor saxophone
Ernie Royal (tracks 1, 2, 4 & 5) - trumpet
Artie Kaplan, Seldon Powell (tracks 1, 2, 4 & 5) - saxophones 
J.J. Johnson (tracks 1, 2, 4 & 5) - trombone
Herbie Hancock (tracks 6-8), John Asbury (track 3), Paul Griffin (tracks 1, 2, 4 & 5) - piano
Bob Cranshaw (tracks 3, & 6-8), George Duvivier (tracks 1, 2, 4 & 5) - bass
Herb Lovelle (tracks 1, 2, 4 & 5), Roy McCurdy (tracks 3, & 6-8) - drums 
Al Gorgoni, Billy Suyker (tracks 1, 2, 4 & 5)  - guitar
George Devens (tracks 1, 2, 4 & 5) - percussion

References

1966 albums
Atlantic Records albums
Nat Adderley albums